The Glen Nature Reserve is a protected nature reserve in the Hunter Region of New South Wales, in eastern Australia.

Features

The reserve is predominantly sclerophyll forest, and contains many endangered species of flora and fauna.

Flora
The Glen Nature Reserve consists of sub-tropical, sclerophyll forest. The major vegetation types are Eucalyptus and Angophora, with many species of fern and orchid.

Fauna

The fauna of The Glen Nature Reserve is well studied, and includes a large biodiversity. There are 14 species of frog, over 70 species of bird, over 20 species of mammal and 18 species of reptile, found in the nature reserve, with more species expected to be found. There are many endangered species of animal within the nature reserve, including the koala (Phascolarctos cinereus) and the yellow-bellied glider (Petaurus australis).

See also

 Protected areas of New South Wales

References

External links

Nature reserves in New South Wales
Hunter Region
Protected areas established in 1999
1999 establishments in Australia